I Don't Mean to be Rude, but... is a 2003 autobiographical book by the television personality and music critic Simon Cowell. The book gives an insight into Simon Cowell's life as well as backstage gossip and tips on how to be successful.

References 

2003 non-fiction books
Idols (franchise)
Music autobiographies
Show business memoirs